The Eaton Park Miniature Railway (EPMR) is situated in Eaton Park, in Norwich, Norfolk.  
 
Construction began in 1957 and the  loop of elevated  and  gauge track opened in May 1960, with public being carried on Summer Sundays. In February 2013 work started on a tunnel, designed to also serve as a secure trolley shed.

References

For More info visit the link below,
http://www.friendsofeatonpark.co.uk/railway.html

Norwich
Miniature railways in the United Kingdom